Onna White (March 24, 1922 – April 8, 2005) was a Canadian choreographer and dancer, nominated for eight Tony Awards.

Early life and career
Born in Inverness, Nova Scotia, White began taking dance lessons at the age of twelve, and eventually her studies took her to the San Francisco Ballet, where she danced in the first full-length U.S. production of The Nutcracker. Her first Broadway performance was in Finian's Rainbow in 1947.  Her next assignment was Guys and Dolls, in which she both performed and assisted the choreographer, Michael Kidd, beginning an association that lasted through various productions until, in 1956, she choreographed her first Broadway show, Carmen Jones.

Personal life
She married actor Larry Douglas in 1948; they divorced in 1959. They had two children: Jeanne and Stuart. She choreographed both the stage version and screen versions of The Music Man (1962), 1776 (1972) and Mame (1974). In 1964, Douglas married Susan Luckey, who played the role of Zaneeta in the film of The Music Man.

Awards
The Academy of Motion Picture Arts and Sciences voted White an Academy Honorary Award for Oliver! (1968), one of the rare occasions that the Academy recognized choreography in film. Other recipients include Gene Kelly for "career achievements", Jerome Robbins for "choreographic achievement on film", Michael Kidd (White's mentor) for "services to the art of dance in the art of the screen" and Stanley Donen for "body of work".  Fred Astaire's was much earlier, and was for his body of work.

White's Oscar is the only one that states the name of a film, i.e. "To Onna White for her outstanding choreography achievement for Oliver!"

Theater credits

1947 Finian's Rainbow (performer)
1949 Regina (performer)
1950 Guys and Dolls (performer)
1950 Arms and the Girl (performer)	
1955 Silk Stockings (performer)
1956 Carmen Jones (choreography)
1957 The Music Man (choreography)
1958 Whoop-Up (choreography)
1959 Take Me Along (choreography)
1960 Irma La Douce (choreography)
1961 Let It Ride (choreography)
1964 I Had a Ball (choreography)
1965 Half a Sixpence (choreography)
1966 Mame (choreography)
1967 Illya Darling (choreography)
1969 1776 (musical staging)
1970 Gantry (direction and choreography)
1971 70, Girls, 70 (choreography)
1974 Gigi (choreography)
1974 Billy (choreography)
1975 Goodtime Charley (choreography)
1979 I Love My Wife (musical staging)
1978 Working (dance and musical staging)

Choreographed films

The Music Man (1962)
Bye Bye Birdie (1963)
Oliver! (1968)
1776 (1972)
The Great Waltz (1972)
Mame (1974)
Pete's Dragon (1977)

Tony Award nominations

1958 Best Choreography for The Music Man
1959 Best Choreography for Whoop-Up
1960 Best Choreography for Take Me Along
1961 Best Choreography for Irma La Douce
1965 Best Choreography for Half a Sixpence	
1966 Best Choreography for Mame
1968 Best Choreography for Illya Darling
1977 Best Choreography for I Love My Wife

References

External links

Place of death missing
1922 births
2005 deaths
20th-century Canadian actresses
21st-century Canadian actresses
Academy Honorary Award recipients
Actresses from New York City
Actresses from Nova Scotia
Broadway theatre producers
Canadian choreographers
Canadian expatriate actresses in the United States
Canadian female dancers
Canadian musical theatre actresses
Canadian musical theatre directors
Film choreographers
People from Inverness County, Nova Scotia
San Francisco Ballet dancers
20th-century Canadian women singers
Canadian women choreographers